Hugh Brown ( – January 23, 1985) was a British-born American sportswriter who was best known for his work with the Philadelphia Bulletin.

Early life
Brown was a native of Edinburgh, Scotland. His family came to the United States when he was five. He attended New York University before dropping out to pursue his career as a writer.

Career
Brown worked for the Waterbury Republican (in Connecticut), Manchester Union-Leader (in New Hampshire), New Haven Register, and the Hartford Courant before joining the Bulletin in 1945.  He retired from the Bulletin in 1971.

Later life and death
In July 1983, Brown was awarded the Dick McCann Memorial Award for his contributions to sports columns.

Brown died from a heart attack in Savannah, Tennessee, on January 23, 1985, at the age of 78.

References

1900s births
Year of birth missing
1985 deaths
American sportswriters
Scottish emigrants to the United States
Writers from Edinburgh